Straight White Male, a novel by California writer Gerald Haslam, won the Western States Arts Federation Book Award for Fiction and the Foreword Magazine Book of the Year Award in 2000.

Plot
The story of a middle-aged couple caring for the husband's aging, ailing parents and their own children, while troubled by a past with which they have never come to terms.

References

2000 American novels